Kot Addu is capital city of Kot Addu District in the Punjab province of Pakistan. This city is subdivided into 5 Union Councils and has a population of over 104 thousand, making it the 70th largest city in Pakistan.

Kot Addu City attracts a large number of tourists every year, due to the Indus river and public gardens among other things. The city is served by Kot Addu Junction railway station.The Zip code of Kot Addu is 34050. It is the 70th largest city of Pakistan according to the 2017 census.

Demography 
 Total population
 8,08,438 persons
 Location on Google Map
 N 30° 28' 34 E 70° 57' 52
 Total Area
 
 Area under cultivation
 4,24,521

The city contains a total of 33 Union councils, which are listed below.

 Haider Ghazi
 Bait Qaimwala
 BhariHoog
 Budh
 Chak No. 547/TDA
 Chak No. 565/TDA
 Chak No. 632/TDA
 Chowk Sarwar Shaheed
 Daira Din Panah
 Dogar Kalasra
 Ghazi Ghatt
 Hinjrai
 Ehsanpur
 Kot Adu No. 2
 Kot Adu No. 1
 Kot Adu No. 3
 Manhan Sharif
 Mehmood Kot
 Mirpur Bhagal
 Pattal Monda
 Pattal Kot Adu
 Patti Ghulam Ali
 Sanawan
 Shadi Khan Monda
 Sheikh Umer
 Thatha Gurmani
 U.C. 22 Gujrat
 Wahandur
 Pirhar
 cha larr wala
 NoorShah
 Basti Sirai
 Alu Rid

Location 

The city of Kot Addu is located in the southern area of Punjab province, almost at the exact center of Pakistan. The area around the city is a flat plain and is ideal for agriculture. There are two main canals (Muzaffar, and T.P. link) and eight sub-canals that cross Kot Addu, providing water from the Indus River. The geographical coordinates of the city, according to Google Maps, are: N 30° 28' 34" E 70° 57' 52".

Geography and climate 

Kot Addu is located almost exactly at the geographical center of Pakistan. The closest major city is Multan. The area around the city is a flat alluvial plain and is ideal for agriculture, with many citrus and mango farms. There are also canals that cut across the Muzaffargarh District, providing water to farms. During the monsoon season, the land close to the Taunsa Barrage is usually flooded.

Kot Addu has an arid climate with very hot summers and mild winters. The city has experienced some of the most extreme weather in Pakistan. The highest recorded temperature was approximately 51 °C (129 °F), and the lowest recorded temperature was approximately −1 °C (30 °F). The average rainfall is roughly 127 millimeters (5.0 inches). Dust storms are a common occurrence within the city.

Education 

Like other major cities in Punjab, Kot Addu features a rich educational landscape. In the last few years, the city has observed a surge in the number of educational institutions. Colleges include private commerce and science colleges, schools, academies like Concordia Colleges (A Project of Beaconhouse), Punjab Inter Science Academy, and a Cadet College (Now: Superior Group Of Colleges). Government degrees are provided for both men and women. Several colleges are affiliated with the Bahuddin Zakrya University, B.Z.U. Multan Pakistan, and Punjab University Lahore Pakistan.  The names of some private institutions are, Kot Addu School of Economics and Management Sciences (Mr. Fiaz Hussain Malik, director), Punjab Higher Secondary School, Bismillah. Inter Science Academy, Punjab Group of Colleges, My School System, Dar-E-Arqam School, Oxford Grammar School, Professor Academy etc.  A Government Technical College is also under construction.

School and colleges 

 Dar-e-Arqam School Kot Addu Campus
 
 Ahmad Schools (PTV) Limited
 Allied School
 BrightWay School System
 C.C.U. The Creator Children University
 The Spirit School Kot Addu (Main Campus)
 The Spirit School Kot Addu (City Campus)
 City Public School Zia Colony, Kot Addu
 Alahad Science Secondary School Kot Addu 
 City School, Kot Addu
 Concordia Colleges (a Beaconhouse project)
 Elementary Teachers Training College Kot Addu
 Ghalib Science Secondary School
 Government College of Commerce Kot Addu
 Government College of Technology Lal Meer Kot Addu
 Government Post Graduate College Kot Addu
 Govt. Boys High School, Kot Addu
 Govt. High School #01, Kot Addu
 Govt. P/s School Basti Sirai
 Hira Girls Science Academy Kot Addu
 Ideal Public School
 IIUI (School) Kot Adu campus
 Learners House school (Kot Addu)
 Little Angel's Garden
 Mairi Darsgah Secondary School for Boys and Girls
 Maryam Public Secondary School
 Moon of Heaven Commerce College
 My School System Kot Addu
 New Ibn-e-Sena School Kot Addu
 New Punjab Higher Secondary School Kot Addu
 Punjab Group of Colleges Kot Addu
 The Scholars Inn School
 Sunny Public School
 Superior Group of Colleges Kot Addu
 Vocational Training Institute Kot Addu

Taunsa Barrage 
Taunsa Barrage is a barrage on the River Indus. This barrage controls water flow in the River Indus for irrigation and flood control purposes.
This barrage serves 2.351 million acres (951,400 hectares) besides diverting flows from Indus River to the Chenab River through Taunsa Panjnad (TP) Link Canal. The barrage also serves as an arterial road bridge, a railway bridge, and crossing for gas and oil pipelines, telephone line and extra high voltage (EHV) transmission lines. In 2011, the rehabilitation of the Taunsa Barrage was blamed for devastation of the Muzaffargarh district during the 2010 Pakistan floods. Critics blamed the rehabilitation of the barrage, alleging that it failed to raise its height and strengthen protective embankments, used dysfunctional computer control system of the hoist gates and ignored hill-torrent management.

Industry 

Kot Addu is a prominent commercial and industrial city in the Punjab province. It is connected by road and rail with Lahore, Karachi, Multan, Rawalpindi, Islamabad, Quetta, and Faisalabad; and also by air from Multan Airport to all Pakistani airports.

Main industries 

 Pak Arab Oil Refinery (PARCO)
 Water And Power Development Authority (WAPDA)

Power stations 

 Kot Adu Power Company (KAPCO)

 LalpirThermal Power Station

Sugar mills 

 Sheikhoo Sugar Mill
 Fatima Sugar Mill

Flour Mills

 Gillani Flour Mill Ltd
 Shoaib Qasim Floor Mill

Besides these, cotton factories, foundries, cotton, woolen, and silk textile mills, flour, and oil mills are also located in this region. This area is famous for its handicrafts (Kundra work), and cottage industries.

Information technology 

With the constantly changing environment in the world and as information technology has become increasingly important, Kot Addu has also adopted this change with a great positive response.  The first professional information technology center was introduced in 2002, named I.TECH, which then also opened a branch in Dubai in 2006, U.A.E.  It is a prominent institution in that region which mainly focuses on web designing and development.  There are many other institutions contributing towards education in Information Technology. It is clear from the interest of the people that this region needs some Great Government I.T. institution. In November 2009 the Government of Pakistan also opened a Great Technical College named LAL-MEER technical college in the Union of Kot Addu.

Health centres 

There is one government civil hospital and several private hospitals in the city, beside much small government and private hospitals in the union councils.Following is the Tehsil-Level Hospital (THQ hospital) in the city:
 THQ Hospital Kot Addu

Agriculture 

Kot Addu is an important agricultural area. Main crops of the area include corn, cotton, rice, sugarcane, tobacco, wheat, and vegetables. Bajra, moong, mash, masoor, and oil seeds (such as mustard and sunflower seeds) are also grown in the district.

Mangoes, citrus, guavas, and pomegranates are Kot Addu's most important fruit crops. Minor fruit crops include dates, jaman, pears, falsa and bananas are also grown.

One other local fruit is called a bare (Berry) . It is one of the main fruits grown in this region. Due to flooding, the crops are now rare, especially cotton and wheat products affected by this flooding.  So, now a majority of the agricultural lands are covered by sugarcane. People either sell this sugarcane to sugar mills or produce Jaggery from sugarcane.

Notable people 

 Inayat Hussain Bhatti - film industry
 Mushtaq Ahmed Gurmani - former Governor of West Pakistan
 Malik Ahmad Yar Hunjra - Member of the Provincial Assembly of the Punjab
 Pathanay Khan  - poet, pride of performance
 Ghulam Mustafa Khar - former Governor and Chief Minister of Punjab
 Hina Rabbani Khar - former Foreign Minister of Pakistan
 Sultan Mehmood - former Minister
 Mian Shabbir Ali Qureshi - former Federal Minister
 Muhammad Ashraf Khan Rind - Member of Provincial Assembly of the Punjab
 Milkha Singh - Indian athlete also known as the "Flying Sikh"

See also 
 Kot Addu Tehsil

References 

Kot Addu District